Reduced to Ashes is the fifth full-length studio album by the American death metal band Deeds of Flesh. It was released in 2003.

Track listing

Personnel

Musicians
Jacoby Kingston – bass, vocals
Erik Lindmark – guitar, vocals
Mike Hamilton – drums

Production
Recorded at Avalon Digital Recording Studios
Produced by Deeds of Flesh
Kip Stork - Engineer

External links
 

2003 albums
Deeds of Flesh albums
Unique Leader Records albums
Albums with cover art by Toshihiro Egawa